Bar Sawma (also spelled Barsauma or Barsoum) is an Aramaic or Syriac name meaning "Son of the Fast" or "Son of Lent."  It may refer to:

People 

 Barsawmo, a mid-fifth century monk and abbot and supporter of Dioscorus of Alexandria
 Barsauma of Nisibis, a late fifth century Metropolitan of Nisibis for the Church of the East
 Catholicos Bar Sawma (d. 1136), a patriarch of the Church of the East in Baghdad
 Rabban Bar Sauma (d. 1294), a bishop of the Church of the East and traveler from China to Europe
 Ignatius Afram I Barsoum (1887-1957), a patriarch of the Syriac Orthodox Church
 Michel Barsoum, American scientist and engineer

Places 

 Monastery of Mor Barsawmo, a monastery near Malatya
 Church of Mor Barsawmo, a church in Midyat
 Mount Barsoum, a mountain in Antarctica

See also 
 Barsoum elements, a mathematical technique in finite element analysis